Rosario Harriott (born 26 September 1989) is a Jamaican footballer who plays as a defender for Harbour View.

Career

Club career 
Harriott began his career with Tru-Juice, where he spent a single season within the youth ranks in 2006. After two years with the Portmore United youth set-up, he joined the first-team in 2009. Scoring four times in 33 appearances during the 2011 campaign, Harriott went on to play over 20 times in his final two seasons with the club.

Portmore were crowned National Premier League champions during the 2011/12 season. Harriott joined Harbour View in 2014, and scored twice in his inaugural season.

International career 
Harriott made his international debut for Jamaica in a 3–0 friendly defeat to South Korea on 13 October 2015. He was cautioned in the match before being substituted in the 71st minute.

International goals
Scores and results list Jamaica's goal tally first.

References 

1989 births
Living people
Jamaican footballers
Jamaica international footballers
Portmore United F.C. players
Harbour View F.C. players
Copa América Centenario players
2017 CONCACAF Gold Cup players
National Premier League players
Association football defenders